The GN boxcab locomotives were the first electric locomotives purchased by the Great Northern Railway (GN) for use through the Cascade Tunnel. Four locomotives were supplied by the American Locomotive Company; they used electrical equipment from General Electric and weighed  each. 

They were three-phase electric locomotives producing  each. The specification called for 1000hp, but the actual output was substantially greater, as described by the consultant engineer Cary T. Hutchinson. They had a B-B wheel arrangement. They were built in February and March 1909, and delivered in Pullman Green. The GN numbered them 5000–5003 and they were used until May 1927.

None survived into preservation.

References

Great Northern Railway (U.S.)
General Electric locomotives
Boxcab
Three-phase AC locomotives
Electric locomotives of the United States
Scrapped locomotives
ALCO locomotives
Standard gauge locomotives of the United States
Railway locomotives introduced in 1909
B-B locomotives
Bo-Bo locomotives